Anita Raynell Andreychuk (born August 14, 1944) is a retired Senator, lawyer, and former judge and diplomat.

Career

A native of Saskatoon, Andreychuk graduated from the University of Saskatchewan with a BA in 1966 and a law degree in 1967, after which she began her legal practice in Moose Jaw, Saskatchewan. In 1976, she was appointed a judge of the Saskatchewan provincial court after having initiated Regina's first family court. She also served from 1977 to 1983 as chancellor of the University of Regina and was chair of the Saskatchewan Institute of Public Policy, a policy research institute created in 2000 by the University of Regina, the University of Saskatchewan and the First Nations University of Canada.

In 1985, Andreychuk was appointed associate deputy minister of social services in the province. Two years later, she was named Canada's High Commissioner to Kenya and Uganda and ambassador to Somalia and the Comoros before becoming ambassador to Portugal in 1990. She was also named, the same year, as Canada's permanent representative to the United Nations Environmental Programme and the United Nations Human Settlements Programme. From 1988 to 1993, she was Canada's permanent representative to the United Nations Human Rights Commission.

In 1993, she was named to the Senate by Governor General Ray Hnatyshyn on the advice of Prime Minister Brian Mulroney. Andreychuk sat as a Progressive Conservative until 2004 when she joined the Conservative Party of Canada.

She has also been active in the Upper House urging recognition of the Ukrainian famine of 1932 to 1933 as a genocide. In May 2008, she was awarded the Order of Yaroslav the Wise for her substantial contribution in the development of Ukrainian-Canadian relations.

Andreychuk was one of thirteen Canadians banned from traveling to Russia under retaliatory sanctions imposed by Russian President Vladimir Putin in March 2014.

Having been appointed in 1993, she was, following the retirement of Anne Cools on August 12, 2018, the longest-serving member of the Senate until her own retirement on August 14, 2019.

Senate Committees

Chair
Foreign Affairs (2010 - 2019)
Human Rights (2001–2009)
Aboriginal Peoples (1994–1996)

Vice-Chair
Conflict of Interest for Senators (2004–2009)
Legal and Constitutional Affairs (2004–2008)
Rules, Procedure and the Rights of Parliament (2004–2007)
Foreign Affairs (1997–1999)
Aboriginal Peoples (1996–1997)

Publications
The work of the Standing Senate Committee on Human Rights: an overview of Children: The Silenced Citizens. Saskatchewan Law Review. 71:23-38 no.1 2008.
 Democracy in the 21st century: Children: the silenced citizens. Canadian Parliamentary Review. 30 (2):2-3 Summer 2007
 Human rights and Canadian foreign policy. University of New Brunswick Law Journal. 45:311-17 1996 (Annual).

References

External links
 
 Foreign Affairs and International Trade Canada Complete List of Posts

1944 births
Living people
Canadian women ambassadors
Lawyers in Saskatchewan
Judges in Saskatchewan
Conservative Party of Canada senators
Progressive Conservative Party of Canada senators
Canadian senators from Saskatchewan
Canadian university and college chancellors
Canadian people of Ukrainian descent
Politicians from Saskatoon
University of Saskatchewan alumni
Women members of the Senate of Canada
Canadian women judges
Women in Saskatchewan politics
Ambassadors of Canada to the Comoros
High Commissioners of Canada to Kenya
High Commissioners of Canada to Uganda
Ambassadors of Canada to Somalia
Ambassadors of Canada to Portugal
University of Saskatchewan College of Law alumni
21st-century Canadian politicians
21st-century Canadian women politicians